Same-sex pornography or homosexual pornography may refer to:
Gay pornography
Lesbian pornography